Ernst Rudolf van Altena (11 December 1933, Amsterdam – 15 June 1999, Landsmeer) was a Dutch poet, writer and translator. He was best known for his translations of chansons by Jacques Brel.

1933 births
1999 deaths
20th-century Dutch poets
20th-century Dutch male writers
20th-century translators
Dutch male poets
Writers from Amsterdam
French–Dutch translators